Syversen is a Norwegian surname, originally a patronymic from the name Syver.

Notable people
Notable people with this surname include:
Fred Syversen (born 1966), Norwegian freeskier
Hans Olav Syversen (born 1966), Norwegian politician
Odd Syversen (born 1945), Norwegian ice hockey player
Ole Fredrik Syversen (born 1971), Norwegian athlete
Rolf Syversen (born 1948), Norwegian rower
Rolf Syversen (musician) (1920–1987), Norwegian musician

References 

Norwegian-language surnames